The Swedish bandy championship final is a yearly event concluding the bandy season in Sweden and deciding the Swedish bandy champions.

From 1907 to 1930, the finalists were decided from a cup tournament and from 1931 the finalists have been decided from a play-off tournament of the top-tier of the Swedish bandy league system.

The first final was held in 1907, when IFK Uppsala beat IFK Gävle with 4–1 in Boulognerskogen, Gävle.

In 1912, two winners were declared, because no replay of the tied final could be played due to the weather.

Below is a list of finals from 1907 to 1949.

1907

1908

1909

1910

1911

1912

Both sides were declared champions since no replay could be played.

1913

1914

1915

1916

1917

1918

1919

1920

1921

1922

1923

1924

1925

1926

1927

1928

1929

1930

In 1930, SK Tirfing made their first appearance and advanced to the final by beating IF Mode in the round of 16 (8–4), IFK Rättvik in the quarter-finals (4–2), and Nacka SK in the semi-finals (4–1).

1931

1932

1933

1934

1935

1936

1937

1938

1939

1940

1941

1942

1943

1944

1945

1946

1947

1948

1949

See also
List of Swedish bandy championship finals (1950–1999)
List of Swedish bandy championship finals (2000–)

References

Swedish bandy championship
Swedish bandy-related lists